The United States Bicentennial was a series of celebrations and observances during the mid-1970s that paid tribute to historical events leading up to the creation of the United States of America as an independent republic. It was a central event in the memory of the American Revolution. The Bicentennial culminated on Sunday, July 4, 1976, with the 200th anniversary of the adoption of the Declaration of Independence by the Founding Father delegates of the Second Continental Congress.

Background
The nation had always commemorated the Founding as a gesture of patriotism and sometimes as an argument in political battles. Historian Jonathan Crider points out that in the 1850s, editors and orators both North and South claimed their region was the true custodian of the legacy of 1776, as they used the Revolution symbolically in their rhetoric.

The plans for the Bicentennial began when Congress created the American Revolution Bicentennial Commission on July 4, 1966.  Initially, the Bicentennial celebration was planned as a single city exposition (titled Expo '76) that would be staged in either Philadelphia or Boston.  After 6½ years of tumultuous debate, the Commission recommended that there should not be a single event, and Congress dissolved it on December 11, 1973, and created the American Revolution Bicentennial Administration (ARBA), which was charged with encouraging and coordinating locally sponsored events.  David Ryan, a professor at University College Cork, notes that the Bicentennial was celebrated only a year after the withdrawal from Vietnam in 1975 and that the Ford administration stressed the themes of renewal and rebirth based on a restoration of traditional values, giving a nostalgic and exclusive reading of the American past.

Ceremonial coinage

Logo 

Bruce N. Blackburn, co-designer of the modernized NASA insignia, designed the logo. The logo consisted of a white five-point star inside a stylized star of red, white and blue.  It was encircled by the inscription American Revolution Bicentennial 1776–1976 in Helvetica Regular. An early use of the logo was on a 1971 U.S. postage stamp.  The logo became a flag that flew at many government facilities throughout the United States and appeared on many other souvenirs and postage stamps issued by the Postal Service.  NASA painted the logo on the Vehicle Assembly Building at the Kennedy Space Center in 1976 where it remained until 1998 when the agency replaced it with its own emblem as part of 40th anniversary celebrations.

1975 events 

The official Bicentennial events began April 1, 1975, when the American Freedom Train launched in Wilmington, Delaware to start its 21-month,  tour of the 48 contiguous states.

On April 18, 1975, President Gerald Ford traveled to Boston to light a third lantern at the historic Old North Church, symbolizing America's third century. The following day, April 19, he delivered a major address in Concord, Massachusetts at the Old North Bridge where the "shot heard round the world" was fired, commemorating the 200th anniversary of the Battles of Lexington and Concord which began the military aspect of the American Revolution.

On December 31, 1975, the eve of the Bicentennial Year, President Ford recorded a statement to address the American people by means of radio and television broadcasts. Presidential Proclamation 4411 was signed as an affirmation to the Founding Fathers of the United States principles of dignity, equality, government by representation, and liberty.

1976 events
Festivities included elaborate fireworks in the skies above major American cities. President Ford presided over the display in Washington, D.C. which was televised nationally. A large international fleet of tall-masted sailing ships gathered first in New York City on Independence Day and then in Boston about one week later. These nautical parades were named Operation Sail (Op Sail) and witnessed by several million observers.  The gathering was the second of six such Op Sail events to date (1964, 1976, 1986, 1992, 2000, and 2012).  The vessels docked and allowed the general public to tour the ships in both cities, while their crews were entertained on shore at various ethnic celebrations and parties.

New York
In addition to the presence of the 'tall ships', navies of many nations sent warships to New York harbor for an International Naval Review held the morning of July 4. President Ford sailed down the Hudson River into New York harbor aboard the guided missile cruiser  to review the international fleet and receive salutes from each visiting ship, ending with a salute from the British guided missile destroyer . The review ended just above Liberty Island around 10:30 am.

Boston
Several people threw packages labeled "Gulf Oil" and "Exxon" into Boston Harbor in symbolic opposition to corporate power, in the style of the Boston Tea party.

Washington, D.C.
Johnny Cash was the Grand Marshall of the U.S. Bicentennial parade.

The event was attended by Queen Elizabeth II and Prince Philip. The Royal couple made a state visit to the United States, toured the country and attended other Bicentennial functions with President and Mrs. Ford. Their visit aboard the Royal Yacht Britannia included stops in Philadelphia, Washington, D.C., Virginia, New York, Connecticut, and Massachusetts.

In Washington, D.C., the Smithsonian Institution opened a long-term exhibition in its Arts and Industries Building replicating the look and feel of the 1876 Centennial Exposition.  Many of the Smithsonian's artifacts dated from the 1876 World's Fair in Philadelphia which commemorated the 100th anniversary of the independence of the United States. The Bicentennial Festival of American Folklife, a collaboration of the Smithsonian with thousands of national and international scholars, folk artisans, and performers, hosted programs in the western part of the National Mall five days a week for twelve weeks in the summer of 1976. The Smithsonian also opened the new home of the National Air and Space Museum on July 1, 1976.

Philadelphia
While in Philadelphia on July 6, 1976, Queen Elizabeth presented the Bicentennial Bell on behalf of the British people. The bell is a replica of the Liberty Bell, cast at the same foundry—Whitechapel Bell Foundry—and bearing the inscription "For the People of the United States of America from the People of Britain 4 July 1976 LET FREEDOM RING."

Los Angeles
Disneyland and The Magic Kingdom at Walt Disney World presented America on Parade, an elaborate parade celebrating American history and culture, and featured the Sherman Brothers' song "The Glorious Fourth".  The parade featured nightly fireworks and ran twice daily from June 1975 to September 1976.

Los Angeles observances included the Bicentennial Parade of 1976 on Wilshire Boulevard, and the Los Angeles City Schools Bicentennial Pageant at Los Angeles Memorial Coliseum, broadcast as part of Happy Birthday, America (NBC), hosted by Paul Anka, Pacific 21, a bicentennial exhibition and conference center, and Knott's Berry Farm bicentennial celebration.

Local observances included painting mailboxes and fire hydrants red, white, and blue. A wave of patriotism and nostalgia swept the nation and there was a general feeling that the irate era of the Civil Rights Movement, the Vietnam War and the Watergate constitutional crisis of 1974 had finally come to an end.

NASA commemorated the Bicentennial by staging a science and technology exhibit housed in a series of geodesic domes in the parking lot of the Vehicle Assembly Building (VAB) called Third Century America. An American flag and the Bicentennial emblem were also painted on the side of the VAB; the emblem remained until 1998, when it was painted over with the NASA insignia. NASA planned for Viking 1 to land on Mars on July 4, but the landing was delayed to July 20, the anniversary of the Apollo 11 lunar landing. On the anniversary of the signing of the Constitution, NASA held the rollout ceremony of the first Space Shuttle (which NASA had planned to name Constitution but was, instead, named "Enterprise" in honor of its fictional namesake on the television series Star Trek).

Many commercial products appeared in red, white, and blue packages in an attempt to tie them to the Bicentennial. Liberty, a brand of Spanish olives, sold their product in glass jars replicating the Liberty Bell during that time. Products were only permitted to display the trademarked Bicentennial logo by paying a license fee to ARBA.

Many national railroads and shortlines painted locomotives or rolling stock in patriotic color schemes, typically numbered 1776 or 1976, and model railroad manufacturers quickly released bicentennial locomotives which were popular among children and adults. Many military units marked aircraft with special designs in honor of the Bicentennial.

John Warner, later U.S. Senator from Virginia, served as ARBA director.

The New Jersey Lottery operated a special "Bicentennial Lottery" in which the winner received $1,776 per week (before taxes) for 20 years (a total of $1,847,040).

The overall theme of the entertainment of Super Bowl X, held January 18, was to celebrate the Bicentennial. Players on both teams, the Pittsburgh Steelers and the Dallas Cowboys, wore a special patch with the Bicentennial Logo on their jerseys; the Cowboys also added red, white and blue striping to their helmets throughout the 1976 NFL season. The halftime show, featuring the performance group Up with People, was entitled "200 Years and Just a Baby: A Tribute to America's Bicentennial".

The United States Olympic Committee initiated bids to host both the 1976 Summer and Winter Olympic Games in celebration of the Bicentennial. Los Angeles bid for the 1976 Olympics but lost to Montreal. Denver was awarded the 1976 Olympic Winter Games in 1970, but concern over costs led Colorado voters to reject a referendum to fund the games and the International Olympic Committee awarded the games to Innsbruck, Austria, the 1964 host.  As a result, there was no Olympics in the United States in 1976 despite a last minute offer from Salt Lake City to host.  However, Lake Placid would host the 1980 Winter Olympics, Los Angeles would eventually be awarded the 1984 summer games, and Salt Lake City would also eventually be awarded the 2002 Winter Olympics.

As site of the Continental Congress and signing of the Declaration of Independence, Philadelphia served as host for the 1976 NBA All-Star Game, the 1976 National Hockey League All-Star Game, the 1976 NCAA Final Four, and the 1976 Major League Baseball All-Star Game at which President Ford threw out the first pitch. The 1976 Pro Bowl was an exception and was played in New Orleans, likely due to weather concerns.

George Washington was posthumously appointed to the grade of General of the Armies of the United States by the congressional joint resolution Public Law 94-479 passed January 19, 1976, with an effective appointment date of July 4, 1976. This restored Washington's position as the highest-ranking military officer in U.S. history.

The Bicentennial Wagon Train Pilgrimage began a journey from Blaine, Washington on June 8, 1975 concluding at Valley Forge, Pennsylvania on July 4, 1976. The wagon train pilgrimage traced the original covered wagon trade and transportation routes across the United States encompassing the Bozeman Trail, California Trail, Gila Trail, Great Wagon Road, Mormon Trail, Natchez Trace Trail, Old Post Road, Old Spanish Trail, Oregon Trail, Santa Fe Trail, and Wilderness Road.

Karen Steele was the first baby born on July 4, 1976, 12 seconds after midnight, and was referred to as the "Bicentennial Baby". She was featured on The Today Show and Good Morning America, and received commemorations from President Ford, New Jersey Governor Brendan Byrne, and a host of other notables.

The Bicentennial on screen

Television
Related network television programs aired July 3–4, 1976
 The Great American Celebration, 12-hour syndicated entertainment program hosted by Ed McMahon and airing the night of July 3
 The Inventing of America (NBC), two-hour BBC co-production reviewing 200 years of American technological innovations and their impact on the world, co-hosted by James Burke and Raymond Burr
 In Celebration of US (CBS), 16-hour coverage hosted by Walter Cronkite
 The Glorious Fourth (NBC), 10-hour coverage hosted by John Chancellor and David Brinkley
 The Great American Birthday Party (ABC), hosted by Harry Reasoner
 Happy Birthday, America (NBC), hosted by Paul Anka from the Los Angeles Memorial Coliseum
 Bob Hope's Bicentennial Star-Spangled Spectacular (NBC)
 Best of the Fourth (NBC), recap with John Chancellor and David Brinkley
 July 4 satellite broadcast of the University of North Texas One O'Clock Lab Band live performance in Moscow (NBC), sponsored by the US Department of State
 Days of Liberty (WABC-TV—New York), animated holiday special
 Goodbye America (PBS), mock "newscast" re-enacting a 1776 debate in the House of Commons concerning the future of the American colonies

The Bicentennial Minute was a series of short vignettes aired on CBS from 1974 through the end of 1976 to mark the occasion.

Saturday morning Bicentennial programs
In the months approaching the Bicentennial, Schoolhouse Rock!, a series of educational cartoon shorts running on ABC between programs on Saturday mornings, created a sub-series called "History Rock", although the official name was "America Rock". The ten segments covered various aspects of American history and government. Several of the segments, most notably "I'm Just a Bill" (discussing the legislative process) and "The Preamble" (which features a variant of the preamble of the Constitution put to music), have become some of Schoolhouse Rock'''s most popular segments.

In 1974, CBS aired a new animated Archie series on Saturday mornings called The U.S. of Archie; 16 episodes were made and were shown in reruns until September 1976.

Films

For the Bicentennial celebration, Hollywood filmmaker John Huston directed a short movie—Independence (1976)—for the U.S. National Park Service which continues to screen at Independence National Historical Park in Philadelphia.

The 1976 film Rocky cited the Bicentennial in several scenes, mostly during Apollo Creed's entering; Carl Weathers dressed first as George Washington then as Uncle Sam.

The oversized vehicle in The Big Bus had a scene in its Bicentennial Dining Room.

Gifts

A number of nations gave gifts to the US as a token of friendship.  Among them were:

The United Kingdom loaned one of the four existing copies of Magna Carta for display in the US Capitol. The document was displayed in a case designed by artist Louis Osman consisting of gold, stainless steel, rubies, pearls, sapphires, diamonds and white enamel. This was on a base of pegmatite and Yorkshire sandstone. The document was displayed atop a gold replica from June 3, 1976 until June 13, 1977, when it was returned. The case and gold replica remain on display in the Capitol.

Canada through the National Film Board of Canada produced the book Between Friends/Entre Amis which was a photographic essay of life along the US-Canada border. The book was given to libraries across the US and special editions were presented to President Gerald Ford and other officials.

The government of France and Musée du Louvre assembled an exhibit of paintings in cooperation with the Detroit Institute of Arts and the Metropolitan Museum of Art that traveled to Detroit and New York City after being shown in Paris.  The exhibit, entitled French Painting 1774–1830: The Age of Revolution, included the work of 94 French artists from that period.  Many of the 149 works in the exhibit had never been seen outside France and included Liberty Leading the People by Eugène Delacroix, Jupiter and Thetis by Jean Auguste Dominique Ingres and a portrait of Maximilien Robespierre by Adélaïde Labille-Guiard.

Japan's government constructed and furnished the 513-seat Terrace Theatre of Kennedy Center in Washington.  Many of the original furnishings were removed when the theater was renovated between 2015 and 2019. Fifty-three bonsai trees from the Nippon Bonsai Association were donated to the U. S. National Arboretum.

King Juan Carlos I and Queen Sofía of Spain presented sculptures of Bernardo de Gálvez, a hero of the American Revolutionary War period and later Viceroy of New Spain; and Don Quixote, Cervantes' fictional hero, on June 3, 1976, on behalf of their nation. The Gálvez sculpture is in a park at Virginia Avenue at 21st Street NW, which has been named Galvez Park. The Don Quixote sculpture was installed nearby on the grounds of The Kennedy Center. Spain's gift also included an exhibit at the National Gallery of Art of eight Goya masterpieces from the collection of Museo del Prado.

King of Norway Olav V, Prime Minister of Norway Odvar Nordli, and Norwegian Government established the Vinland National Health Sports Center in Loretto, Minnesota.

Gallery

See also

 Bicentennial Minutes
 Bicentennial Series
 Bikecentennial
 Spirit of '76 Patriotic Sentiment
 Centennial Exposition in Philadelphia, Pennsylvania (1876)
 Sesquicentennial Exposition in Philadelphia, Pennsylvania (1926)
 United States Semiquincentennial (2026)
 Utah State Route 95 - also known as the Bicentennnial Highway

Notes

References

Further reading
 Capozzola, Christopher. "'It Makes You Want to Believe in the Country': Celebrating the Bicentennial in the Age of Limits" in Beth Bailey & David Farber, eds., America in the 70s (2004) pp 29–45.
 Gordon, Tammy S. The Spirit of 1976: Commerce, Community, and the Politics of Commemoration. Amherst, MA: University of Massachusetts Press, 2013. .
 Hall, Simon.  "'Guerrilla Theater...in the Guise of Red, White, and Blue Bunting': The People's Bicentennial Commission and the Politics of (Un-) Americanism." Journal of American Studies'' (2016): 1-23.

External links 
 The Story of America's Freedom Trains
 
 
 
 
 
 
 

 
1976 in the United States
Holidays related to the American Revolution
Bicentennial anniversaries
July 1976 events in the United States